Pavel Kolařík (born 23 October 1972) is a Czech former professional ice hockey defenceman.

Kolařík previously played for SKP Poprad and HC Kladno before joining HC Slavia Prague in 1996 where he spent four seasons. He was drafted 268th overall by the Boston Bruins in the 2000 NHL Entry Draft and played 23 games over two seasons. He scored no points and collected 10 penalty minutes. He spent most of his tenure in the American Hockey League with the Providence Bruins.

He returned to Slavia in 2002 and guided the team to their first championship in 2003. He would remain with the team until his retirement in 2018. He was 45 years old at the time of his retirement.

Career statistics

Regular season and playoffs

International

External links
 

1972 births
Living people
Boston Bruins draft picks
Boston Bruins players
Czech ice hockey defencemen
HC Kobra Praha players
HC Berounští Medvědi players
HC Slavia Praha players
HK Poprad players
Providence Bruins players
Rytíři Kladno players
People from Vyškov
Sportspeople from the South Moravian Region
Czech expatriate ice hockey players in the United States
Czechoslovak ice hockey defencemen